Blooded on Arachne is a collection of science fiction stories by American author Michael Bishop.  It was published in 1982 by Arkham House in an edition of 4,081 copies.  The volume, Bishop's first short fiction collection, contains two novellas as well as two poems.

Contents

 Preface
 "Among the Hominids at Olduvai" (poem)
 "Blooded on Arachne"
 "Cathadonian Odyssey"
 "Effigies"
 "The House of Compassionate Sharers"
 "In Chinistrex Fortronza the People are Machines"
 "Leaps of Faith"
 "On the Street of the Serpents" (novella)
 "Piñon Fall"
 "Rogue Tomato"
 "Spacemen and Gypsies"
 "The White Otters of Childhood" (novella)
 "For the Lady of a Physicist" (poem)

Reprints
New York: Timescape/Pocket (paperback), January 1983.

References

External links
 Michael Bishop official website

1981 short story collections
Short story collections by Michael Bishop (author)
Arkham House books